Chapter VI 【Atlantis】 is the sixth studio album of Taiwanese band F.I.R. It was released on April 15, 2011.

Track listing

Charts

References

F.I.R. albums
2011 albums
Warner Music Taiwan albums